Daughters, Incorporated, or Daughters, Inc., was an American feminist publishing house founded by June Arnold and Parke Bowman in 1972. Based in New York, N.Y., their publications primarily revolved around gender and lesbian experiences.

List of books published by Daughters, Inc. 

 Applesauce by June Arnold
 Sister Gin by June Arnold
 Ruby Fruit Jungle by Rita Mae Brown
 Lover by Bertha Harris
 Happenthing in travel on by Carole Spearin McCauley

Daughters, Inc. closed down in 1978.

References 

Publishing companies established in 1972
Feminist organizations in the United States
1978 disestablishments in New York (state)
1972 establishments in New York City
Publishing companies disestablished in 1978
American companies established in 1972
American companies disestablished in 1978
Women in New York City